Sergelen ("smart") is a district of Töv Province in Mongolia.

Airport

Khöshigt Valley, located in Sergelen, is the location of Chinggis Khaan International Airport, which started its operations in 2021. The airport, built with a loan from the Japanese Government, has a capacity twice that of Buyant-Ukhaa International Airport, and has a highway connection to Ulaanbaatar. It is also planned to build the modern city of 100,000 population by the airport.

References

Notable residents

Districts of Töv Province